Madeira Park is an unincorporated community in the area of Pender Harbour on the Sunshine Coast of southwestern British Columbia, Canada.

It is named after the pioneer Jose Goncalos, a native of the Madeira Islands who settled in the area in the early 1900s.

References

External links

Unincorporated settlements in British Columbia
Populated places in the Sunshine Coast Regional District
Populated places on the British Columbia Coast